Kowzareh (also Romanized as Koozreh; also known as Gū Zereh, Kūh Zareh, Kūh Zereh, Kūrza, and Kūzra) is a village in Shur Dasht Rural District, Shara District, Hamadan County, Hamadan Province, Iran. At the 2006 census, its population was 2,140, in 495 families.

References 

Populated places in Hamadan County